The Pakistan national cricket team toured Sri Lanka from 16 to 30 April 1997. The tour included two Tests between Sri Lanka and Pakistan. Pakistan also played a first-class against Sri Lanka Board XI. The Test series ended in a draw with both matches drawn.

Squads

Pakistan's Waqar Younis was ruled out of the Test series due to a fractured toe on day two of the tour match against Sri Lanka Board XI. The captain of his side and fellow paceman Wasim Akram also returned home owing to a shoulder injury.

Tour match

Two-day match: Sri Lanka Board XI vs Pakistan 

The Marvan Atapattu-led Sri Lanka Board XI won the toss and elected to bat first. Opening batsman Russel Arnold of the Nondescripts Cricket Club top-scored for his side making 140 in 381 minutes striking 20 fours through his innings. He shared a 104-run stand with Sanjeeva Ranatunga (52) for the second wicket, before both were dismissed by Mohammad Zahid. Chasing 301 in their first innings, Pakistan lost their captain Rameez Raja cheaply towards the end of play on day one. Saleem Elahi and Saleem Malik then went on to score centuries on day two, making 106 in 272 minutes and 100 in 184 minutes respectively. For the Board XI, Arnold also shone with the ball claiming three wickets for 7 runs helping reduce the opposition from 242/3 to 281/8 at the end of play.

Test series

1st Test

2nd Test

References

External links
 Pakistan in Sri Lanka, April 1997 at ESPNcricinfo archive
 

1997 in Pakistani cricket
1997 in Sri Lankan cricket
International cricket competitions from 1994–95 to 1997
1996-97
Sri Lankan cricket seasons from 1972–73 to 1999–2000